Maria Anzbach, Niederösterreich, Austria is a town in the district of Sankt Pölten-Land in the Austrian state of Lower Austria.

Population

References

Cities and towns in St. Pölten-Land District